Waveney was a local government district in Suffolk, England, named after the River Waveney that formed its north-east border. The district council was based in Lowestoft, the major settlement in Waveney. The other towns in the district were Beccles, Bungay, Halesworth and Southwold.

The district was formed on 1 April 1974, under the Local Government Act 1972, as a merger of the municipal boroughs of Beccles, Lowestoft and Southwold, along with Bungay and Halesworth urban districts, Wainford Rural District and part of Lothingland Rural District. The population of the district at the 2011 Census was 115,254. The last elections to the council were held on 7 May 2015, the second election after the council moved to a Whole Council election system, meaning all 48 council seats were contested. Before the 2011 elections the council was under Conservative Party control.

Waveney district was merged with Suffolk Coastal district on 1 April 2019 to form the new East Suffolk district.

At the 2011 election the Conservatives had lost overall control, with both it and the Labour party represented by 23 councillors, the balance of the council being made up of one Green Party and one Independent councillor. A series of procedural moves led to the formation of a Conservative-led administration. At the 2015 election the Conservatives won an absolute majority, with 27 seats, with Labour winning 20 and the Green Party 1.

Politics

List of communities
Outside of Lowestoft there are 59 towns and civil parishes in Waveney:

References

External links

Waveney District Council

 
Non-metropolitan districts of Suffolk
East Suffolk (district)
Former non-metropolitan districts